Sovetsky is a rural locality (a khutor) in Kirovskoye Rural Settlement of Maykopsky District, Russia. The population was 517 as of 2018. There are 5 streets.

Geography 
Sovetsky is located 21 km north of Tulsky (the district's administrative centre) by road. Severny is the nearest rural locality.

References 

Rural localities in Maykopsky District